Nitschke is the name of:

 Jack Nitschke (1905–1982), South Australian cricketer
 Philip Nitschke (1947– ), South Australian medical doctor, founder of pro-euthanasia group Exit
 Ray Nitschke (1936–1998), American football player
 Richard Nitschke (1863–1944), South Australian baritone and racehorse owner
 Shelley Nitschke (1976– ), South Australian woman cricketer
 Theodor Rudolph Joseph Nitschke (1834–1883), German botanist

Surnames from given names